Clube Atlético Muçulmano, usually known simply as Atlético Muçulmano, is a traditional football (soccer) club based in the neighbourhood of Machava in Matola, Mozambique. The club's players and members are nicknamed os muçulmanos

Stadium
The club plays their home matches at Campo Do Atlético Muçulmano, which has a maximum capacity of 5,000 people

Achievements
Taça de Moçambique: 1
2007/08

Performance in CAF competitions
CAF Confederation Cup: 1 appearance
2009: Preliminary Round

Current squad

Clube Atletico Muculmano
Sport in Maputo
2004 establishments in Mozambique